Appiah Ntiaw (born 1979 in Cape Coast, Ghana), received an education at Ghanatta College of Art and Design in Accra with a focus on Painting and Graphic Design. He has two younger brothers and two older sisters. His brothers work in the military as peacekeepers in Liberia while one sister lives with his mom, the other in Cape Coast. Appiah Graduated in 2002 and was able to qualify for the annual art competition titled the Ghana Association of Visual Artists.

Gallery
Along with his friend, he has created an art painting gallery. The gallery is called “Step Beyond” and is located in Cape Coast, Ghana. The gallery showcases different verses of African paintings. Appiah also helps and supports charity organizations such as African Footprint International and New Life Orphanage in Cape Coast, Ghana. With an increase in his sales and skills he undertook a new job in Denmark. He works on design with the Juel Sandberg brand. He still sells artwork and is known for the variety of his pieces. They are described as conveying emotion and daily life. He takes his memories of Africa and his childhood and turns them into bright colorful paintings. He claims that Denmark has not influenced his art style and methods.

References

“African Paintings Ghanaian Artist Appiah Ntiaw’s Biography.” 2009. Accessed December 11, 2016. https://www.trueafricanart.com/pages/appiah-ntiaw-bio
“African Paintings Ghanaian Artist Appiah Ntiaw’s Biography.” 2009. Accessed December 11, 2016. https://www.trueafricanart.com/pages/appiah-ntiaw
African Artist Appiah Ntiaw Artwork Paintings - 2018 - https://www.trueafricanart.com/collections/appiah-ntiaw

Ghanaian artists
People from Cape Coast